Munsons Corners is a hamlet and census-designated place (CDP) in Cortland County, New York, United States. The population was 2,728 at the 2010 census.

Munsons Corners is a community in the town of Cortlandville at the southwest border of the city of Cortland.

Geography
Munsons Corners is located in the western part of the town of Cortlandville at  (42.581271, -76.208178). It is bordered to the northeast by the city of Cortland and to the northwest by the area of Cortlandville listed by the U.S. Census Bureau as "Cortland West".

The junction of New York State Route 13 and New York State Route 281 is in the western part of the community. NY-13 leads northeast into Cortland and southwest  to Ithaca, while NY-281 leads north  to the village of Homer.

Demographics

As of the census of 2000, there were 2,426 people, 1,078 households, and 597 families residing in the village. The population density was 1,079.2 per square mile (416.3/km2). There were 1,184 housing units at an average density of 526.7/sq mi (203.2/km2). The racial makeup of the CDP was 95.88% White, 0.62% African American, 0.12% Native American, 1.11% Asian, 0.33% from other races, and 1.94% from two or more races. Hispanic or Latino of any race were 1.32% of the population.

There were 1,078 households, out of which 23.1% had children under the age of 18 living with them, 40.7% were married couples living together, 10.7% had a female householder with no husband present, and 44.6% were non-families. 32.3% of all households were made up of individuals, and 13.1% had someone living alone who was 65 years of age or older. The average household size was 2.24 and the average family size was 2.72.

In the community, the population was spread out, with 19.2% under the age of 18, 16.4% from 18 to 24, 24.0% from 25 to 44, 22.9% from 45 to 64, and 17.4% who were 65 years of age or older. The median age was 36 years. For every 100 females, there were 86.3 males. For every 100 females age 18 and over, there were 82.2 males.

The median income for a household in the village was $27,222, and the median income for a family was $31,983. Males had a median income of $26,429 versus $19,865 for females. The per capita income for the CDP was $16,640. About 14.7% of families and 21.6% of the population were below the poverty line, including 17.9% of those under age 18 and 6.8% of those age 65 or over.

References

Census-designated places in New York (state)
Hamlets in New York (state)
Census-designated places in Cortland County, New York
Hamlets in Cortland County, New York